iLuminate is a theatrical and technology company based in New York, New York, USA, best known for competing in the sixth season of America's Got Talent. They finished in third place.

The dancers were dressed in black and performed in the dark, but audience members were able to see them because the dancers' suits were covered in a mixture of electroluminescent wire and LEDs; the flashing lights that all the dancers wore were synchronized to display various effects.

History 
The company was founded in 2009 by Miral Kotb, a software engineer. By 2019, iLuminate had performed in over 15 countries.

Las Vegas show 
On August 26, 2021, iLuminate held its first performance at The Strat in Las Vegas. The show blends music, dance, technology and art with dancers that wear special light suits.

iLuminate held its 100th show on March 6, 2022, at The STRAT Theater.

See also
 America's Got Talent (season 6)

References

External links
Official website
Instagram

America's Got Talent contestants
People from Los Angeles
Dance companies in New York City
Dance companies in the United States
Las Vegas shows